William Blair (31 July 1820, in Dundonald, Scotland – 13 July 1880, in Waukesha, Wisconsin) was a member of the Wisconsin State Senate three times. First, from 1864 to 1865, second, from 1872 to 1873 and third, from 1876 to 1887. Additionally, he was President of the Waukesha, Wisconsin, Board.

His former home, now known as the Sen. William Blair House, is listed on the National Register of Historic Places.

References

1820 births
1880 deaths
Mayors of places in Wisconsin
People from South Ayrshire
Politicians from Waukesha, Wisconsin
Scottish emigrants to the United States
Wisconsin state senators

19th-century American politicians